Complexodus is an extinct conodont genus in the family Pterospathodontidae.

References

External links 

 Complexodus at fossilworks.org (retrieved 4 May 2016)

Ozarkodinida genera